The Cry is a British television thriller miniseries, comprising four fifty-minute episodes, that first broadcast during April 2002 on ITV. The series stars Sarah Lancashire as Meg Bartlett, a child protection officer working for social services, who after suffering a second miscarriage, befriends a young mum, Christine Rearden (Emma Cunniffe), whom she later suspects of abusing her daughter, Eleanor. Joe Duttine, Anthony Calf and James Laurenson co-starred alongside Lancashire and Cunniffe. The series was directed by David Drury and written by playwright Peter Ransley. Two episodes were broadcast each week.

The Cry received mixed critical reviews, with The Movie Zone stating that it "would be better chopped down to 135 minutes", with some scenes feeling "padded" and the series "making more of subplots than it needs to". The Cry was also broadcast in Australia in December 2005. The series was released on VHS in the UK on 24 February 2003. Despite remaining unreleased on DVD in its native country, The Cry was released on DVD in the Czech Republic.

Cast
 Sarah Lancashire as Meg Bartlett; a child protection officer
 Emma Cunniffe as Christine Rearden; a young mum Meg suspects of abusing her daughter
 Anthony Calf as Simon Bartlett; Meg's husband
 Joe Duttine as Ian Rearden; Christine's husband and a former premier league footballer
 James Laurenson as Richard Crossdyke; Meg's father and Home Secretary
 Jasper Britton as Mark Billington; Richard Crossdyke's personal assistant
 Louise Bush as Sarah Oswell; nurse at the local community hospital
 Cathy White as Nell Doyle; nurse at the local community hospital
 Michael Cochrane as Nathaniel Weekly; defence barrister representing Christine and Ian
 Anna Keaveney as Pauline Taylor; housekeeper of a cottage where Meg goes to hide out
 Bev Willis as Dr. Oliver Erskine; a local GP who examines the Rearden's baby whilst in Meg's care

Episodes

References

External links
 

2002 British television series debuts
2002 British television series endings
2000s British crime television series
2000s British drama television series
ITV television dramas
2000s British television miniseries
English-language television shows
Television series by Fremantle (company)
Films directed by David Drury